Park Jin-Hyok, is a North Korean programmer and hacker. He is best known for his alleged involvement in some of the costliest computer intrusions in history. Park is on the FBI's wanted list. North Korea denies his existence.

Life and career

Early life 

Park attended the Kim Chaek University of Technology in Pyongyang. He has traveled to China in the past and conducted IT work for the North Korean company "Chosun Expo" in addition to activities conducted on behalf of North Korea's Reconnaissance General Bureau.

Lazarus group and computer hacking 

Park is a member of a North Korea's government-funded hacking team known as “Lazarus Group (or APT 38)” and worked for Chosun Expo Joint Venture (aka Korea Expo Joint Venture), a North Korean government front company, to support the North Korean government’s malicious cyber actions. Chosun is affiliated with Lab 110, a component of North Korea's military intelligence. Expo Joint Venture had offices in China (PRC) and North Korea.

Sony Pictures hack 

In November 2014, the conspirators launched a destructive attack on Sony Pictures Entertainment in retaliation for the movie The Interview, a political action comedy film that depicted the assassination of the DPRK’s leader by a CIA spy. North Korea denied allegations of hacking.

WannaCry ransomware attack 

The United States Department of Justice has charged Park and other members of Lazarus group for the WannaCry ransomware attack of 2017, a computer virus that used encryption to encrypt file on affected systems and affected many businesses throughout the world, including United Kingdom’s NHS, where nonfunctional computer systems led to thousands of appointments being canceled.

See also 

 Lazarus Group
 2013 South Korea cyberattack
 July 2009 cyberattacks
 Sony Pictures hack
 WannaCry ransomware attack

References 

Kim Chaek University of Technology alumni
Living people
Hackers
Year of birth missing (living people)
Fugitives wanted by the United States
Fugitives
21st-century North Korean people